Soleymaniyeh (also Romanized as Soleymānīyeh; also known as Soleymānī) is a village in Najafabad Rural District, in the Central District of Sirjan County, Kerman Province, Iran. At the 2006 census, its population was 681, in 174 families.

References 

Populated places in Sirjan County